Ritu  is a 2014 Nepali romantic love story film that portrays the emotional behaviour of young lovers. Directed by Manoj Adhikari, Ritu is the first Nepali Film produced from Australia. The theme of the movie is "Seasons change with time, so do the hearts and feelings inside". Change is inevitable. Be it in the nature, or our feelings, or relationships. Things don't always work out the way we've planned. It takes turns we'd never even imagined.

Plot 
Ritu is a simple romantic story about the similar changes that took place in the lives of Meena, Suraj and Kripa. Ritu analyses the relationships of its characters through time. It's not about falling in love, but about not letting your love wither and fall. Cast of the movie are Raj Ballav Koirala, Malina Joshi, Rima Bishwokarma, Kamal Silwal, Bishnu Neupane, Iva Ivanova, Bulson, Mana Khatri, Sushila Budhathoki, Written By Sandeep Badal Produced By Alp Entertainment in Association with Planet3Films, Apil Bista Films and Ashok Gautam Films

Cast 
 Raj Ballav Koirala 
 Malina Joshi
 Reema Bishwokarma
 Riya Patil as Ritu
 Anubha Rastogi as Mother
 Sanjay Vishwakarma as Buyer

References

External links
 

2014 films
Nepalese romantic drama films